The Preliminary SAT/National Merit Scholarship Qualifying Test (PSAT/NMSQT) is a standardized test administered by the College Board and cosponsored by the National Merit Scholarship Corporation (NMSC) in the United States. In the 2018-2019 school year, 2.27 million high school sophomores and 1.74 million high school juniors took the PSAT. Scores from the PSAT/NMSQT are used to determine eligibility and qualification for the National Merit Scholarship Program.

History 

The PSAT has been administered every fall since 1971. Some PSAT scores obtained before June 1993 are accepted as qualifying evidence for admission to intellectual clubs such as Intertel and American Mensa.

Prior to 1997, the PSAT was composed of only Math and Verbal sections. The Verbal section received a double weighting to allow a full composite score of 240 points. The Writing Skills section, introduced in 1997, was partially derived from the discontinued Test of Standard Written English (TSWE).

The PSAT changed its format and content in Fall 2015.  Originally, each of the three sections was scored on a scale of 20 to 80 points, adding up to a maximum composite score of 240 points. This paralleled the SAT, which is graded on a scale of 200 to 800 for each section (the narrower range is to distinguish from which test a score comes and to denote less accuracy). However, unlike the old (2005) SAT, the old PSAT did not include higher-level mathematics (e.g. concepts from Algebra II) or an essay in its writing section (which was added to the SAT in 2005). The number of multiple-choice answers was reduced from five to four, improving the likelihood of making a successful guess, and the quarter-point penalty for wrong answers was eliminated.

Format and scoring

Students register for the exam through high schools which are members of the College Board. The test is composed of four sections: two Math Sections, Critical Reading, and Writing Skills; and takes two hours and forty five minutes to complete.

The PSAT changed its format and content in Fall 2015, to reflect the new SAT. The Reading and Writing Sections are combined into one section score, and the Math section now includes a portion in which usage of calculators is prohibited. The scores for each section range from 120 to 760, adding up to a maximum score of 1520.  Yet the National Merit Scholarship Corporation takes each section score, scored on a scale of 6 to 38, sums it and then doubles that sum to devise the Selection Index, ranging from 36 to 228.

The test is mostly multiple-choice, but there are four grid-in math questions at the end of each math section that require takers to enter their responses on a grid.

Levels of recognition
There are three levels of recognition: "Commended", Semi-Finalists, and Finalists. About 34,000 students, which is 3-4% of all PSAT takers, are "commended" and receive Letters of Commendation.

The "commended" cut-off is determined at whichever score yields the 96th percentile nationally. It rose from 202 for the 2006 Program (2004 PSAT) to 203 for the 2007 Program (2005 PSAT). It was 205 for the 2008 Program (2006 PSAT) and 209 for the 2009 Program (2007 PSAT).

Students are confirmed as semifinalists as seniors, one year after taking the PSAT. Afterwards students must complete an application to become a Finalist. Other factors besides the PSAT Selection Index score are taken into account, such as the student's Grade Point Average (GPA) and a confirming SAT score.

Popular culture

In recent years, it has become a popular subject of discourse among test-takers on various social media networks. Many of them poke fun at passages or questions in the PSAT that they find strange or amusing. The level of discussion is so significant that in 2013, the hashtag #PSAT reached trending status on Twitter near its administration date. This is despite the fact that since 2012, test participants have been required to copy and sign a statement agreeing to the test regulations, which include not discussing the test. Previously, that statement had to be written in cursive, a requirement that had drawn ire from both students and teachers, as many students found writing the statement in cursive to be difficult. However, in 2015, the requirement to write the statement in cursive was removed.

See also

SAT
PLAN (a preliminary ACT test)

References

External links
 What's on the Test

Standardized tests in the United States
1971 introductions